Imma is a large genus of moths in the obtectomeran "micromoth" family Immidae. This is the type genus of its family. They are widespread in the tropics, with most species occurring between the Himalayas and the Oceanian region; the genus is furthermore plentiful in the Neotropics, but not very diverse in the Afrotropics.

Selected species
Species of Imma include:

 Imma accuralis (Walker, [1859])
 Imma acosma (Turner, 1900)
 Imma acrognampta Meyrick, 1930
 Imma acroptila Meyrick, 1906
 Imma aeluropis Meyrick, 1906
 Imma albifasciella (Pagenstecher, 1900)
 Imma albofascia (Felder, 1861)
 Imma albotaeniana (Sauber, 1901)
 Imma alienella (Walker, 1864)
 Imma amphixantha Meyrick, 1906
 Imma ancistrota Meyrick, 1912
 Imma arenaria Diakonoff, 1955
 Imma aritogiton Diakonoff, 1955
 Imma arsisceles Meyrick, 1937
 Imma asaphoneura Meyrick, 1934
 Imma assita J.F.G.Clarke, 1986
 Imma atrosignata (Felder, 1861)
 Imma atrotacta Diakonoff, 1955
 Imma aulonias Meyrick, 1906
 Imma autodoxa (Meyrick, 1886)
 Imma auxobathra Meyrick, 1906
 Imma bifulminata Meyrick, 1930
 Imma bilineella (Snellen, 1885)
 Imma boeta (Druce, 1898)
 Imma caelestis Meyrick, 1906
 Imma campsigramma Meyrick, 1938
 Imma cancanopis Meyrick, 1906
 Imma catapsesta Meyrick, 1934
 Imma chasmatica Meyrick, 1906
 Imma chloromelalis (Walker, [1866])
 Imma chloroplintha Meyrick, 1928
 Imma chlorosoma Meyrick, 1906
 Imma chlorosphena Meyrick, 1906
 Imma chlorospila Meyrick, 1923
 Imma chrysoplaca Meyrick, 1906
 Imma cincta (Druce, 1898)
 Imma ciniata (Druce, 1898)
 Imma cladophragma Meyrick, 1906
 Imma confluens Meyrick, 1931
 Imma congrualis Walsingham, 1900
 Imma cosmoplaca Meyrick, 1930
 Imma costipuncta (Felder & Rogenhofer, 1874)
 Imma crocozela Meyrick, 1906
 Imma cuneata Meyrick, 1906
 Imma cymbalodes Meyrick, 1906
 Imma cyclostoma Meyrick, 1906
 Imma dedicata Meyrick, 1925
 Imma denticulata Meyrick, 1910
 Imma diaphana (Pagenstecher, 1884)
 Imma diluticiliata (Walsingham, 1900)
 Imma dioptrias Meyrick, 1906
 Imma dipselia Meyrick, 1906
 Imma epichlaena Meyrick, 1906
 Imma epicomia Meyrick, 1906
 Imma ergasia (Meyrick, 1905)
 Imma eriospila Meyrick, 1922
 Imma euglypta Meyrick, 1931
 Imma evelina Meyrick, 1938
 Imma feaniensis J.F.G.Clarke, 1986
 Imma flammula Diakonoff, 1978
 Imma flavibasa (Moore, 1888)
 Imma flaviceps (Felder & Rogenhofer, 1874)
 Imma francenella Legrand, 1966
 Imma fulminatrix Meyrick, 1934
 Imma gloriana J.F.G.Clarke, 1986
 Imma grammarcha (Meyrick, 1905)
 Imma halonitis Meyrick, 1920
 Imma harpagacma Meyrick, 1935
 Imma hectaea Meyrick, 1906
 Imma hemixanthella (Holland, 1900)
 Imma heppneri J.F.G.Clarke, 1986
 Imma homalotis Meyrick, 1906
 Imma homocrossa Meyrick, 1930
 Imma hyphantis Meyrick, 1906
 Imma impariseta J.F.G.Clarke, 1986
 Imma inaptalis (Walker, [1866])
 Imma inclinata Diakonoff, 1955
 Imma infima Meyrick, 1930
 Imma itygramma Meyrick, 1928
 Imma leniflua Meyrick, 1931
 Imma leucomystis Meyrick, 1923
 Imma lichneopa (Lower, 1903)
 Imma lithosioides (Moore, 1887)
 Imma loxoscia Turner, 1913
 Imma lyrifera Meyrick, 1910
 Imma lysidesma Meyrick, 1906
 Imma mackwoodi (Moore, 1887)
 Imma marileutis Meyrick, 1906
 Imma megalyntis Meyrick, 1906
 Imma melanosphena Meyrick, 1918
 Imma melotoma Meyrick, 1906
 Imma mesochorda Meyrick, 1906
 Imma metachlora Meyrick, 1906
 Imma metriodoxa Meyrick, 1906
 Imma microsticta (Hampson, 1897)
 Imma monastica Meyrick, 1910
 Imma monocosma Diakonoff & Arita, 1979
 Imma mormopa Meyrick, 1910
 Imma mylias
 Imma nephelatma Meyrick, 1927
 Imma nephallactis Meyrick, 1906
 Imma nephelastra Meyrick, 1906
 Imma neurota Meyrick, 1906
 Imma niphopelta Meyrick, 1930
 Imma niveiciliella (Snellen, 1885)
 Imma nubigena Meyrick, 1910
 Imma obliquefasciata Walsingham, 1900
 Imma ochrilactea Meyrick, 1934
 Imma ochrophara Bradley, 1962
 Imma otoptera Meyrick, 1906
 Imma oxypselia Meyrick, 1928
 Imma panopta Meyrick, 1906
 Imma paratma Meyrick, 1912
 Imma pardalina (Walker, 1863)
 Imma penthinoides (Pagenstecher, 1884)
 Imma periploca Meyrick, 1910
 Imma phalerata Meyrick, 1906
 Imma philomena J.F.G.Clarke, 1986
 Imma philonoma Meyrick, 1925
 Imma phthorosema Meyrick, 1912
 Imma platyxantha Turner, 1913
 Imma porpanthes Meyrick, 1906
 Imma priozona Meyrick, 1906
 Imma procrossa Meyrick, 1906
 Imma protocrossa Meyrick, 1909
 Imma psithyristis Meyrick, 1906
 Imma psoricopa Meyrick, 1906
 Imma pyrophthalma Meyrick, 1937
 Imma quadrivittana (Walker, 1863)
 Imma quaestoria Meyrick, 1911
 Imma rotia J.F.G.Clarke, 1986
 Imma rugosalis Walker, [1859]
 Imma selenaea Diakonoff, 1955
 Imma semicitra Meyrick, 1937
 Imma semiclara Meyrick, 1929
 Imma spanista Meyrick, 1930
 Imma steganota Meyrick, 1914
 Imma stilbiota (Lower, 1903)
 Imma strepsizona Meyrick, 1906
 Imma synconista Meyrick, 1918
 Imma tesseraria Meyrick, 1906
 Imma tetrascia Meyrick, 1912
 Imma tetrope (Diakonoff, 1978)
 Imma thianthes Meyrick, 1927
 Imma thymora Meyrick, 1906
 Imma thyriditis Meyrick, 1906
 Imma torophracta Meyrick, 1935
 Imma trachyptila Meyrick 1921
 Imma transversella (Snellen, 1878)
 Imma triardis Meyrick, 1906
 Imma trichinota Meyrick, 1906
 Imma tyrocnista Meyrick, 1906
 Imma uranitis Meyrick, 1910
 Imma vaticina Meyrick, 1912
 Imma viola (Pagenstecher, 1886)
 Imma xantharcha Meyrick, 1906
 Imma xanthosticha (Turner, 1936)
 Imma xanthomela Meyrick, 1930

Selected former species
 Imma grammatistis Meyrick, 1906
 Imma minatrix Meyrick, 1906
 Imma radiata (Walsingham, 1897)

Footnotes

References
 
 
  (2011): Australian Faunal Directory – Imma. Version of 2011-MAY-11. Retrieved 2011-DEC-22.
  (1986): Pyralidae and Microlepidoptera of the Marquesas Archipelago. Smithsonian Contributions to Zoology 416: 1–485. PDF fulltext  (214 MB!)
  (2010): Markku Savela's Lepidoptera and some other life forms – Imma. Version of 2010-JUN-07. Retrieved 2011-DEC-22.

Immidae
Moth genera